Stadion Kollárova ulice is a multi-use stadium in Vlašim, Czech Republic.  It is currently used mostly for football matches and is the home ground of FC Sellier & Bellot Vlašim.

References
 Photo gallery and data at Erlebnis-stadion.de

Football venues in the Czech Republic
FC Sellier & Bellot Vlašim
1927 establishments in Czechoslovakia
Sports venues completed in 1927
20th-century architecture in the Czech Republic